Tom Warhurst Jr. (born 17 February 1963) is a former Australian rules footballer who played for the Norwood Football Club in the South Australian National Football League (SANFL) and the Adelaide Football Club in the Australian Football League (AFL).

Warhurst had already played over 200 SANFL games when he was signed by Adelaide for their debut season in 1991. He had previously been twice recruited by VFL clubs, but on each occasion decided to stay at Norwood. A three time South Australian representative, Warhurst was a member of Norwood's 1982 and 1984 premiership teams.

He took part in Adelaide's first AFL game, against Hawthorn at Football Park, where he kept key forward Dermott Brereton goal-less in a convincing win for the club. The 28-year-old played again the following round, in a loss to Carlton, but did not make any further appearance for Adelaide. It was also his last season of senior football as he needed a knee reconstruction at the year's end.

His father, Tom Warhurst senior and brother, John Warhurst, were also Norwood footballers. They are however better known for their other careers, Tom senior being a leading tennis player and John a noted academic.

References

1963 births
Australian rules footballers from South Australia
Norwood Football Club players
Adelaide Football Club players
Living people